Coleman is a town in and the county seat of Coleman County, Texas, United States. As of the 2010 census, its population was 4,709.

Geography
Coleman is located north of the center of Coleman County at  (31.827694, −99.425689). U.S. Routes 84 and 283 pass through the northeast side of the city. US 84 leads northwest  to Abilene and southeast  to Brownwood, while US 283 leads north  to Baird and south  to Brady.

Coleman has five multipurpose recreational lakes within 30 miles.

Demographics

2020 census

As of the 2020 United States census, there were 3,912 people, 1,758 households, and 1,051 families residing in the city.

2000 census
At the census of 2000,  5,127 people, 2,179 households, and 1,403 families resided in the city. The population density was 831.9 people per square mile (321.4/km). The 2,658 housing units averaged 431.3/sq mi (166.6/km). The racial makeup of the city was 85.04% White, 2.95% African American, 0.66% Native American, 0.23% Asian, 8.89% from other races, and 2.22% from two or more races. Hispanics or Latinos of any race were 16.93% of the population.

Of the 2,179 households, 28.8% had children under the age of 18 living with them, 48.3% were married couples living together, 11.6% had a female householder with no husband present, and 35.6% were not families. About 32.5% of all households were made up of individuals, and 19.3% had someone living alone who was 65 years of age or older. The average household size was 2.33 and the average family size was 2.93.

In the city, the population was distributed as  25.0% under the age of 18, 7.7% from 18 to 24, 23.1% from 25 to 44, 21.7% from 45 to 64, and 22.5% who were 65 years of age or older. The median age was 40 years. For every 100 females, there were 87.2 males. For every 100 females age 18 and over, there were 82.1 males.

The median income for a household in the city was $22,769, and for a family was $28,356. Males had a median income of $24,226 versus $15,526 for females. The per capita income for the city was $13,752. About 19.3% of families and 24.0% of the population were below the poverty line, including 34.4% of those under age 18 and 14.6% of those age 65 or over,  median age 42.6 yrs.

Education
The city is served by the Coleman Independent School District, which has about 1,000 students. During the 2006–2007 academic year, 475 students were in elementary schools, 203 were in junior high, and 274 were in high school.

Notable people

 Ronnie Dunn of the country group Brooks & Dunn, was born in Coleman in 1953
 Tom Jones, co-writer of The Fantasticks, went to high school in Coleman
 Carobeth Laird, ethnologist, was born in Coleman

Camp Colorado

Camp Colorado was established in 1855 and abandoned in 1861. The camp then became headquarters for the Texas Mounted Rifles in 1861 and the Texas Frontier Regiment in 1863.

Climate
The climate in this area is characterized by hot, humid summers and generally mild to cool winters.  According to the Köppen climate classification system, Coleman has a humid subtropical climate, Cfa on climate maps.

References

External links
City of Coleman official website
Coleman Texas Chamber of Commerce

Cities in Texas
Cities in Coleman County, Texas
County seats in Texas